The Toston Bridge is a site on the National Register of Historic Places spanning the Missouri River, on an abandoned segment of old U.S. Route 287, at Toston, Montana.  It was added to the Register on July 20, 2005.

It is a steel, three-span riveted Warren through truss bridge supported by two reinforced concrete piers and by reinforced concrete abutments.

It crosses the Missouri River in an area where the river flows north.

References

Road bridges on the National Register of Historic Places in Montana
Bridges completed in 1920
National Register of Historic Places in Broadwater County, Montana
Steel bridges in the United States
Warren truss bridges in the United States
Bridges over the Missouri River
1920 establishments in Montana